James Winston may refer to:

 James Winston (thespian) (1773–1843), English strolling player and theatre manager
 James Winston (baseball), American Negro league pitcher in the 1930s
 James Brown Winston, medical officer and councillor in Los Angeles, California
 Jimmy Winston, English musician and actor

See also
 Jameis Winston, American football quarterback